Niphad is the name both of the town and the Taluka headquartered there. It is within the Nashik District of Maharashtra, India. The Marathi name signifies "a place without mountains", and indeed the taluka's topography is fairly level, with hardly any hills. It is served by Niphad railway station. Located northeast of Nashik city, the Taluka borders Sinnar, Nashik, Dindori, Chandwad, and Yeola Talukas and Ahmednagar District, and has no direct access to the sea. The Niphad Sub-Division is composed of Niphad, Sinnar and Yeola Talukas.

Niphad Town

Although facilities in the surrounding villages are improving, the town remains the local transportation and communication hub as well as the seat of government and law enforcement, with additional district courts serving the Niphad, Yeola and Pimpalgaon Baswant courts. Niphad is also the center for medical and veterinary care, trade, banking (with Canara Bank, State Bank of India, Bank of Maharashtra, Oriental Bank of Commerce, Corporation Bank, State Bank of Hyderabad, HDFC Bank, Land Development Bank branches and many Co-operative Banks. It is also a center for education, with high schools, junior colleges, senior colleges, government ITI and other technical Institutes.

Religious sites
Niphad Town is home to a number of Hindu temples dedicated to various deities, as well as to a Dargah and a few mosques. A traditional fair in honour of Shree Khandoba (not to be confused with another Khandoba fair in Chandori in the Taluka) is held on Magha Shuddha Paurnima and attracts a large number of people from the surrounding areas.

Flora and fauna
Agrarian Niphad is one of the district's most fertile—and flood-prone—talukas.
Its major rivers are the Godavari and its tributary, the Kadawa; as of 1975 irrigation was achieved by means of the Vadali river dam, bandhara, near the taluka, in addition to "well over a hundred" wells. Sugarcane is one of the most important agricultural products and the basis for a sugar refining and alcohol distilling industry, conducted at two co-operative sugar factories, the Niphad Sahakari Sakhar Karkhana in Bhausahebnagar and the Karmaveer Kakasaheb Wagh Sahakari Sakhar Karkhana in Kakasahebnagar. Major wine producers in the Vinchur MIDC area are the Vinsura and Vinsula wineries. Other major crops include onions, grapes, soybean, tomatoes and flowers, all exported internationally, as well as wheat, gram, and other vegetables and grains (pearl millet, sorghum, tur). 

Wine Industry : Niphad is the largest grape processing location in India.
Niphad has been described as "California of Maharashtra" due to the numerous grape growing area and wineries in the taluka, There are 10 wineries in Niphad. 
Vinchur Wine park is reserve for wine industry. Every year wineries celebrates Wine festival "India Grape Harvest" (IGH) in the harvest season. 
Vinsura, WIC, Vintage , Nipha Winery are involved in Wine tourism activities in the Niphad taluka.

Demographics
In the 2011 census, the niphad town has population of 20249 of which 10371 are males while 9878 are females.

Niphad town has higher literacy rate compared to Maharashtra. In 2011, literacy rate of Niphad town was 82.39 % compared to 82.34 % of Maharashtra. In Niphad Male literacy stands at 87.32 % while female literacy rate was 77.31 %.

See also
Khaede

References

Cities and towns in Nashik district
Talukas in Maharashtra